Charles Caldwell Dobie (March 15, 1881 - January 11, 1943) was a writer and historian in San Francisco. His novel The Blood Red Dawn was adapted into the movie The Inner Chamber in 1921. His stories were published in magazines and included in anthologies. He also received honors for his work. He wrote several novels. His work featured his hometown, San Francisco. The Bancroft Library at the University of California at Berkeley has a collection of his papers.

Dobie was born in San Francisco. He wrote the Bohemian Grove play for 1920 and was photographed at the grove by a portrait of himself by Gabriel Moulin.

Bibliography
 The Blood Red Dawn (1920)
 Less Than Kin (1926)
 San Francisco's Chinatown
 Broken to the Plow
 Less than Kin (1926)
 Portrait of a Courtesan (1934)
 San Francisco: a Pageant, illustrated by Edward Howard Suydam (1885 – 1940), D. Appleton & Co. New York, NY and London (1933)
 The Crystal Ball, a collection of his stories about California published as a pamphlet for members of the Book Club of California (1937)
 San Francisco Adventures
 San Francisco Tales
 The Golden Talisman: A Grove Play

References

1881 births
1943 deaths
20th-century American novelists
Writers from California
People from San Francisco
American male novelists
20th-century American male writers